Cayla (Rivas) Kaolelopono is an American motorcycle racer based in Fresno, California, who set the FIM World Record by reaching a speed of 252.901 km/h, riding a modified Royal Enfield 650cc Twin, in 2018 Bonneville Motorcycle Speed Trials (BMST), held at Bonneville Speedway. While setting the record on 29 August 2018, she was 18 years old. Cayla was backed up by team Royal Enfield and S&S Racing.

So far Cayla is holding 26 world-records in motorcycle racing.

Personal life
Cayla Rivas is the daughter of Chris Rivas, a four-time NHRA Pro Stock Motorcycle drag racing champion, who is her mentor in motorcycle racing. Cayla Rivas studied photojournalism.

References

External links
 Twitter
 Chris Rivas V-Twin

Living people
Sportspeople from Fresno, California
American motorcycle racers
Land speed record people
Female motorcycle racers
Year of birth missing (living people)